United Arab Emirates competed at the 2013 World Aquatics Championships in Barcelona, Spain between 19 July and 4 August 2013.

Swimming

Emirati swimmers achieved qualifying standards in the following events (up to a maximum of 2 swimmers in each event at the A-standard entry time, and 1 at the B-standard):

Men

References

External links
Barcelona 2013 Official Site
UAE Swimming Federation web site

Nations at the 2013 World Aquatics Championships
2013 in Emirati sport
United Arab Emirates at the World Aquatics Championships